James Edward Pash (December 23, 1948 – April 29, 2005) was an American musician and recording artist. Pash was originally the surf saxophonist for The Surfaris, an early California surf rock group in the 1960s, known for the 1963 instrument hit "Wipe Out". In later years, Pash dedicated his time to his Harp of David project, a recreation of the original harp and song melodies used by King David of the Bible.

He died April 29, 2005 at Yucca Valley, San Bernardino County, California, USA, from congestive heart failure while waiting for a liver transplant. A United States Army veteran who served in the Vietnam War, Pash is buried at Riverside National Cemetery in Riverside, California.

References

External links
Surfaris - official site
 
 

1948 births
2005 deaths
The Surfaris members
Surf musicians
Burials at Riverside National Cemetery
20th-century American musicians